Merlot is a wine or wine grape.

Merlot or MERLOT may also refer to:

 Merlot blanc, a separate grape variety
 Merlot, an open-source project on which the Xerlin open source XML editor is based
 MERLOT (Multimedia Educational Resource for Learning and Online Teaching), a program of the California State University in partnership with higher education institutions, professional societies, and industry

See also
 Merlaut, a commune in the Marne department in north-eastern France
 Merlo (disambiguation)